In Philippine culture, loob or kalooban refers to one's inner self, or, more specifically, to the internal dimension of a person's identity.  Its external counterpart is labas - the physical, outward appearance.  Loob is a core concept in Filipino Psychology, a field which is unthinkable without both the internal and external dimensions, "loob"/"labas".

Loob or kalooban has been compared to similar concepts in other Southeast Asian and Oceanian cultures, such as the Indonesian concept of batin or kebatinan.

Loob as a psycho-moral reality: Katauhan at Pagkatao 
"Walang sarili kung walang loob."

According to a publication by Dionisio M. Miranda entitled Loob--The Filipino Within, Loob can be viewed as a psycho-moral reality. This part of the publication says that Loob is made of two more concepts, and these are katauhan and pagkatao.

From this, katauhan and pagkatao seem like similar concepts, but they translate to personality and character, respectively, which are often used interchangeably but are two very different things.

Personality (psychological), according to Loob as a psycho-moral reality, embodies the traits, attitudes or habits that distinguish one individual from another. It is the complex or one's behavioral and emotional tendencies. It is not just the structure or the organization of these qualities, but it is the whole of these qualities that gives form and meaning to an individual and his existence.

It is more or less static in the way that it is the basic or initial particularity of a person, what makes him different from everyone else. It could eventually be viewed from static to dynamic (changing) terms.

Moral character, on the other hand, is understood to be mainly dynamic and secondarily static. It is related to personality in the sense that character is based on personality and is initially determined by it. In the concrete sense, character is the aspect which constitutes one's ethnicity which structures him not only as subject (ako) but further as a moral subject and moral agent.

Content-wise, it is the values and attitudes, principles and norms, ideals and projects that lend the person his moral form (kaloobang makatao). In the generic sense, it responds to perceptions of realities of good and evil, right and wrong, appropriate and inappropriate and so on.

Personality as Katauhan, Character as Pagkatao

The core of both personality and character is the ego or the self. Sarili (self) manifests itself either as personality or as character.

Loob as Katauhan (Personality) 
 Makes us distinct/unique from others
 Static
Under Katauhan are the following distinctive constituents:

Malay (Awareness, Consciousness) 
 One needs to be active; "awareness is not awareness unless it is active"
 Malay/Awareness about the environment/external aspects and about yourself
 Pagbabalik-loob (returning to one's true self)

Dama (Could be internal or external) 
 Sensitivity to your surroundings
 This is the most visible form of Katauhan
 Emotions (specific and objective)
 Sensations
 Desire (combination of both)

Ugali (Behavior, Tendency, Habit) 
 As biological (predisposition; habit)
 As will (goals, instincts; how you act)
 As how one decides/decision making (action, will)

Loob as Pagkatao (Character) 
 More on one's moral aspect
 Dynamic not real
Under Pagkatao are the following distinctive constituents:

Isip (Mind, Thinking, Sense) 
 As thoughts, content of consciousness, awareness (malay)
 As intelligence (talino), wisdom (karunungan)
 As reasoning (katuwiran)
 Intelligence, skill, critically analyze (logic)
 faithful to what they know to be true, reality (katotohanan)
 As one's affirmation/stand (paninindigan) - action of one's thoughts; there is a moral aspect to these actions
 Beliefs, principles

Bait (Goodness - Intrinsic, Critical, Practical) 
 Intrinsic, innate (everyone has goodness within themselves)
 Intuitive (in Isip, the discrimination of goodness occurs discursively)
 The language consistently associates bait with the more positive emotions and sentiments.
 Knowing what is acceptable and what is not.
 This kind of bait may initially characterize the katauhan of the self (sarili) for example, as a kind of natural endowment. In being consistent with the self (sarili) over time, this defines the pagkatao (character) of a person. In other words, "bait must not remain merely natural; it must also become personal."
 Practical
 There are "levels" of bait (ex. kulang sa bait (lacking in common sense), nasiraan ng bait (mad, crazed, psychotic) etc.)
 There is actually a "set" amount of bait (it should be just right; no more, no less)

Kalooban 
 Right or wrong (tama o mali; moral will)
 Kusa (indicative moral will) refers to both purpose and intention.
 Sadya (moral imperative) where the ought that is presented is a value for the person himself (when an object is encountered as a force, therefore imperative) either as something that is already part of his nature or something needed to perfect it.
 Pasiya (moral decisions of the will) is that which takes a clear and concrete stand for or against such options (characteristic choices). Kalooban as decisive will looks similar to isip as paninindigan. However, isip is more theoretical and generic; kalooban is more practical and concrete.

Concepts whose expression involves "loob" 
The word Loob, simply taken as 'inside' and not a construct, is also used for "looban," which means an interior compound, or community; and for the term "manloloob", which means 'robber', literally 'someone who enters'.

As a core concept of value, Loob and its variants are a critical aspect of numerous Filipino value constructs, of which the following are examples:

See also 
Culture of the Philippines
Filipino Psychology

Sources 

Philippine culture